Vikram Yoganand is an Indian film director, editor, writer, cinematographer and commercial ad maker predominantly working in the Kannada film industry.

After graduating, Vikram started making short films and music videos. Miley Somehow was his earliest work shot in and around Bangalore, completed in 2013. After a few successful projects with Chandan Shetty, he directed the feature film Heegondhu Dina, starring Sindhu Loknath under his company Smart Screen Productions.

After the critically acclaimed Heegondhu Dina, Vikram Yoganand is all set for his second feature film, and this time, he is directing a crime comedy called Kushka. Vikram says that what is unique about this multi-starrer, is the film's colour palette.

Filmography

References

21st-century Indian film directors
Living people
Film editors from Karnataka
Kannada film editors
Film directors from Bangalore
Kannada film directors
Year of birth missing (living people)